Bensimon may refer to:

People
 Albert Bensimon (born 1948), Egyptian-born Australian businessman
 Doris Bensimon (1924–2009), Austrian-born French sociologist and academic
 Gilles Bensimon (born 1944), French fashion photographer
 Jacques Bensimon (1943–2012), Canadian film and television director, producer and executive
 Kelly Killoren Bensimon (born 1968), American author, socialite and former model

Other
 La tennis Bensimon, French lifestyle brand

Jewish surnames